Antigua and Barbuda competed at the 2015 World Championships in Athletics in Beijing, China, from 22 to 30 August 2015.

Results

Men
Track and road events

Women
Field events

References

Nations at the 2015 World Championships in Athletics
World Championships in Athletics
Antigua and Barbuda at the World Championships in Athletics